Captain Godfrey Alexander French  (1 July 1900 – 10 April 1988) was a Royal Navy officer and the last British officer to serve as Deputy Chief of the Naval Staff of the Indian Navy.

Career
Following his cadetship from 1913–16, French was appointed midshipman in HMS Emperor of India  and served in the Grand Fleet. Promoted sub-lieutenant, he served as First Lieutenant of HMS Nith, and was an undergraduate at Selwyn College, Cambridge in 1920. He was appointed a Commander of the Order of the British Empire, Military Division (CBE) in the 1954 Birthday Honours.

References

Deputy Chiefs of Naval Staff (India)
1900 births
1988 deaths
Commanders of the Order of the British Empire
Royal Navy personnel of World War I
Royal Navy personnel of World War II
Royal Navy officers
Indian Navy officers
British people in colonial India